The Nasty Rabbit (also known as Spies a-Go-Go) is a 1964 American Techniscope spy comedy film directed by James Landis and starring Misha Terr and Arch Hall Jr.

Plot
A Russian submarine lands one of their agents disguised as a cowboy carrying a rabbit that is carrying a deadly virus.  The Soviets plan for the rabbit to infect the United States through breeding with American rabbits with the goal of killing large numbers of Americans.

Cast
 Michael Terr as Mischa Lowzoff (as Mischa Terr)
 Arch Hall Jr. as Britt Hunter
 Liz Renay as Cecelia Solomon (as Melissa Morgan)
 Arch Hall Sr. as Marshall Malout / Malcolm McKinley (as William Watters)
 Hal Bizzy as Heinrich Krueger
 Jack Little as Maxwell Stoppie
 Ray Vegas as Pancho Gonzales
 John Akana as Col. Kobayaski
 Sharon Ryker as Jackie Gavin
 Hal Bokar as Gavin

Production
Richard Kiel stated in an interview with Tom Weaver that the lead composer Mischa "Michael" Terr financed the film. Arch Hall Jr. recalled that Terr wished to be an actor with Arch Hall Sr. writing the film about a Russian character. Pat and Lolly Vegas later formed the group Redbone.

Soundtrack
"The Robot Walk" (Written by Lolly Vegas and Pat Vegas)
"Jackie" (Written by Lolly Vegas and Pat Vegas)
"The Spy Waltz" (Written by Lolly Vegas and Pat Vegas)
"The Jackrabbit Shuffle" (Written by Lolly Vegas and Pat Vegas)

See also
 List of American films of 1964

Notes

External links

1964 films
1960s spy comedy films
American spy comedy films
Cold War spy films
Films shot in Wyoming
1964 comedy films
1960s English-language films
1960s American films